The Marib Dam (or  ) is a modern dam blocking the Wadi or Valley of Adhanah (also Dhanah ) in the Balaq Hills, located in the Ma'rib Governorate in Yemen. The current dam was built in the 1980s and is close to the ruins of the ancient dam, first built in the 8th century BC. It was one of the engineering wonders of the ancient world and a central part of the Sabaean and Himyarite kingdoms around Ma'rib.

There are also other important ancient dams in Yemen such as the Dam of Jufaynah, the Dam of Khārid, the Dam of Aḑraʾah, the Dam of Miqrān and the Dam of Yathʾān. Historically, Yemen has been recognized for the magnificence of its ancient water engineering. From the Red Sea coast to the limits of the Empty Quarter Desert are numerous ruins of small and large dams made of earth and stone.

Ancient dam
The site of the great Dam of Marib, also called the Dam of 'Arim, is upstream (south-west) of the ancient city of Maʾrib, once the capital of the ancient kingdom of Sabaʾ (possibly Sheba). The Kingdom of Sabaʾ was a prosperous trading nation, with control of the frankincense and spice routes in Arabia and Abyssinia. The Sabaeans built the dam to capture the periodic monsoon rains which fall on the nearby mountains and so irrigate the land around the city. Some tentative archaeological findings suggest that simple earth dams and a canal network were constructed as far back as around 1750 BC, but the most reliable information dates the Great Dam of Marib to about the 8th century BC. It is counted by some as one of the most wonderful feats of engineering in the ancient world.

The medieval Arab geographer Yāqūt al-Ḥamawī describes it thus:
It is between three mountains, and the flood waters all flow to the one location, and because of that the water only discharges in one direction; and the ancients blocked that place with hard rocks and lead. The water from springs gathers there as well as floodwater, collecting behind the dam like a sea. Whenever they wanted to they could irrigate their crops from it, by just letting out however much water they needed from sluice gates; once they had used enough they would close the gates again as they pleased.

Construction

The date of the first construction of a dam at Ma’rib goes back to somewhere between 1750 and 1700 BC. The earliest inscription on the dam is one placed there at the time of its construction or repair of parts of the dam undertaken by Yatha' Amar Watar I, son of Yada' El Zarih I, who reigned in 760–740 BC. The following repair was in the time of Yada' El Bayin II who reigned in 740–720 BC. Renovations were then carried out by Dhamar El Zarih I and Karab El Bayin who reigned in 700–680 BC. All repairs were minor, consisting of essential maintenance, such as removing dirt, or opening water courses, or stopping up gaps. The Makrib Samah' El Yanuf II, son of Dhamar El Watar II, had his name carved into parts of the dam to mark the completion and repair of the dam.

It ran between two groups of rocks on either side of the river and was linked to the rock with substantial stonework. The dam's position allowed for a spillway and sluices between the northern end of the dam and the cliffs to the west.

After the end of the Kingdom of Sabaʾ, the dam fell under the control of the Ḥimyarites around 115 BC.

Maintenance
The Muslim historian al-Isfahani (whose Annals were completed in 961 CE) maintains that the famous breach of the dam occurred some four hundred years before the rise of Islam, but Yāqūt al-Ḥamawī assigns it to the time of Abyssinian rule.

Ancient South Arabian sources report that in about 145 BC, the dam suffered a major breach during the war between the people of Raydān and the Kingdom of Sabaʾ, and that is the very breach that many scholars consider to have caused the Sayl al-ˁArim (Flood of the ‘Arim) mentioned in the Quran; it is also mentioned in Arab proverbs which speak about the hands of Sabaʾ having separated at that time. The fighting between the Raydānites and the Sabaeans delayed the repair of the dam, and this caused devastating losses of crops and fruit, leading large numbers of people to disperse in search of new land capable of supporting life, so huge migrations ensued. It is still uncertain though whether it was that particular breach that caused the "flood of ˁArim" or not, since some migrations certainly took place in the 2nd or 3rd centuries CE, and they are also ascribed to the breaking of the Dam of Maʾrib. Generally speaking, the dam was repaired twice shortly before the coming of Islam, once by Sharḥabīl Yaˁfar bin Abī Karab Yasˁad in 450 , and by Abrahah in 543. The inscriptions on the dam explain the costs of repair and the large number of workers involved.

The archaeology of the Ma'rib Dam shows the effects of siltation behind dams in antiquity, and measures to extend the operational life of the reservoir.  The same problems of siltation encountered in the ancient dam were also faced in the construction of the new dam.

Despite the increases in height, the dam suffered numerous breaches (recorded major incidents occurred in 449, 450, 542 and 548) and the maintenance work became increasingly onerous; the last recorded repairs took place in 557.

Final breach
Local tales report that the final breach of the dam had been predicted by a king called ʿImrān, who was also a soothsayer, and later by the wife of the king. According to legend, the breach was caused by large rats gnawing at it with their teeth and scratching it with their nails. In 570 or 575, the dam was again overtopped, and this time left unrepaired. The final destruction of the Dam of Maʾrib is alluded to in the Quran (34: 15–17):

Consequences
The consequent failure of the irrigation system provoked the migration of up to 50,000 people from Yemen to other areas of the Arabian Peninsula, and even to the Levant.

Modern dam

A new dam was built in the 1980s by Doğuş Group's construction company Doğuş Construction, close to the location of the old one, at the expense of Sheikh Zayed bin Sultan Al Nahyan, the late President of the U.A.E., whose tribe reportedly resettled from Ma'rib to his country, sometime during the 17th century, or in the 6th century, after the collapse of the historical dam. The opening ceremony took place on 20 December 1986, in the presence of Zayed and Ayhan Şahenk, Founder and Chairman of Doğuş Group. 

The dam was considered by people inside and outside Yemen to have a positive effect on the agriculture and economy of the region of Ma'rib, and the country in general.

The new dam, like the old, was designed to store water for irrigating the Ma'rib plains. Seepage that emanates from this dam does not threaten its structure, but results in the loss of water. As a way of capturing the seepage, consideration is being given to rebuilding the ancient Ma'rib dam, both as a functioning structure, and as a historic monument and tourist attraction. The complexity and volume of work involved in this project make it necessary that several organizations work together under the aegis of UNESCO, using financial contributions from international organizations.

Newly constructed dams in Yemen, such as Batis Dam and Ma'rib, are used to collect water for the population. A newspaper wrote in July 2010: "The water level in the Ma'rib Dam has risen to 45 million cubic meters as a result of the heavy rainfall in various areas of Yemen in the past two days. Under-Secretary of Ma'rib Governorate, Ali Muhammad al-Fatimid, was briefed Tuesday on the amount of water flowing into the dam and the maintenance of drainage channels and sub systems. The Deputy Director of the Ma'rib Dam Project, Engineer Ahmed al-Arifi, said the water level in the dam on Tuesday rose to 45 million cubic meters, while the water level last April rose to 100 million cubic meters. The gate of the main channel for groundwater was opened in the valley of Ubaida for three months, where the quantity of water flowing amounted to 80 million cubic meters."

The dam was damaged in an airstrike in 2015. Yemeni officials said that Saudi Arabian coalition forces were responsible for the airstrike.

See also
 Jawa Dam (Jordan), also an archaeological site

Notes

References

Bibliography
M. C. A. Macdonald, Wabar, in: Jack Sasson, M. (ed.), Civilization of the Ancient Near East 8, London, 1995, 1351.
Alessandro de Maigret. Arabia Felix, translated Rebecca Thompson. London: Stacey International, 2002. 
Andrey Korotayev. Ancient Yemen. Oxford: Oxford University Press, 1995. .
 Hadden, Robert Lee. 2012. The Geology of Yemen: An Annotated Bibliography of Yemen's Geology, Geography and Earth Science. Alexandria, VA: US Army Corps of Engineers, Army Geospatial Center.

Architecture of ancient Yemen
Arabic architecture
Archaeological sites in Yemen
Dams in Yemen
Dam failures in Asia
Dams completed in 1986
Gravity dams
Ancient history of Yemen
1986 establishments in Yemen
Marib Governorate
Landmarks of the Ancient Kingdom of Saba (Marib)